Sterminos River may refer to:
 Sterminos, a tributary of the Negoi in Hunedoara County, Romania
 Sterminos, a tributary of the Jiul de Est in Hunedoara County, Romania
 Sterminos, a tributary of the Jiul de Vest in Hunedoara County, Romania